Federico Damián Millacet Echevarría (born 21 July 1991) is a Uruguayan footballer who plays as a forward for Gualaceo S.C. in the Ecuadorian Serie A.

References

External links

1991 births
Living people
Uruguayan footballers
Uruguayan expatriate footballers
C.A. Progreso players
Juventud de Las Piedras players
Sud América players
San Marcos de Arica footballers
Uruguayan Primera División players
Uruguayan Segunda División players
Primera B de Chile players
Expatriate footballers in Chile
Association football forwards